John Robert Holmes (3 September 1927 – 29 December 2011) was a Canadian politician. First elected in the 1972 federal election, he served as a Progressive Conservative Member of Parliament representing the riding of Lambton—Kent.  He was re-elected in the 1974 and 1979 elections, but was defeated in the 1980 election.

References 

1927 births
2011 deaths
Progressive Conservative Party of Canada MPs
Members of the House of Commons of Canada from Ontario